The III Grand Prix de Nîmes was a Formula One motor race held on 1 June 1947 at Nîmes-Courbessac Aerodrome, Nîmes. The race was held over 70 laps and was won by Luigi Villoresi in a Maserati 4CL. Villoresi started from pole and set fastest lap. Louis Chiron was second in a Talbot-Lago T26 and Reg Parnell third in a Maserati 4CL.

Classification

References

Nîmes
Nîmes
Nîmes